Trinder Park railway station is located on the Beenleigh line in Queensland, Australia. It serves the Logan suburb of Woodridge.

1985 Trinder Park collision
On 23 March 1985, two EMUs collided head-on near Trinder Park. A train driver and a passenger were killed, and 31 others were injured. The units involved were EMU11 and EMU27; both were repaired and were retired in 2019 as part of the retirement and recycling program being undertaken by Queensland Rail.

Gold Coast Logan Faster Rail
In 2021, it was announced the station was being relocated and the railway line be realigned to avoid slow winds in the route.  This caused the resumption of numerous homes in Woodridge. The project aims to have rail transport be able to meet capacity during the 2032 Olympic Games by doubling the track capacity from two to four tracks between Kuraby and Beenleigh railway station.

Services
Trinder Park is served by all stops Beenleigh line services from Beenleigh to Bowen Hills and Ferny Grove.

Services by platform

References

External links

Trinder Park station Queensland's Railways on the Internet
[ Trinder Park station] TransLink travel information

Railway stations in Logan City
Railway stations in Australia opened in 1888